Beloff is a surname of a number of people:

 Angelina Beloff (1879–1969), Russian painter and sculptor
 Evan Beloff, Canadian film writer, producer, and director 
 Elena Beloff, American filmmaker and author
 Jim Beloff, Ukulele musician, Publisher
 John Beloff (1920–3006), English psychology professor
 Leland Beloff, Pennsylvania politician
 Max Beloff, Baron Beloff (1913–1999) was a British historian and principal of the University College of Buckingham
 Michael Beloff (1942-) an English barrister
 Zoe Beloff, visual artist

See also
 Anne Beloff-Chain (1921–1991), British biochemist